Janine L. Brown (born 1954) is a scientist specializing in the reproductive biology of endangered species. She is the head of the National Zoological Park's Endocrine Research Laboratory at the Smithsonian Conservation Biology Institute. Brown has been called "a world authority on elephant reproductive biology" and is in charge of the elephant reproduction program at the National Zoological Park (United States).

Life
She received her Bachelor of Arts in animal sciences from North Dakota State University in 1976, and her Master of Arts in 1980 and Doctor of Philosophy in 1984 in animal sciences from Washington State University.

Selected publications

References

American women scientists
Veterinary scientists
Smithsonian Institution people
American physiologists
Women physiologists
North Dakota State University alumni
Washington State University alumni
1954 births
Living people
21st-century American women